The Cyp11c1 is a fish gene encoding a CYP450 enzyme, which was originally found in Zebrafish (Danio rerio), this enzyme mainly catalyze the formation of cortisol and 11-Ketotestosterone (11-KT). 11-KT is the endogenous androgen in zebrafish. CYP11C is the orthologous to CYP11B, tetrapod's CYP11B1 evolved from CYP11C1 of fish, and CYP11B/11C are the ohonologues to CYP11A, which duplicated during 2R event.

References 

11
fish